The Grand Ditch, also known as the Grand River Ditch and originally known as the North Grand River Ditch, is a water diversion project in the Never Summer Mountains, in northern Colorado in the United States. The water would otherwise have gone into the Colorado River (formerly known as the "Grand River", from which the name of the ditch is derived) that flows west towards the Pacific; instead, the Cache La Poudre River goes East and through the Mississippi River discharges into the Gulf of Mexico.

The ditch was started in 1890 and wasn't completed until 1936. It significantly impacts the ecology in the valley below and the National Park Service has fought in court to reduce the amount of diverted water.

History

The Grand Ditch was built by the Larimer County Ditch Company, mostly by Japanese crews, working with hand tools and black powder. The first diverted water flowed east across La Poudre Pass on October 15, 1890. Water Supply and Storage Company took over ownership in 1891. The ditch was extended every year, and reached three miles in 1894.

After the creation of Rocky Mountain National Park, increasing demand for water led to the creation of Long Draw Reservoir, and the required land was taken away from the park by Congress in 1923. Long Draw reservoir opened in 1930.

The flood left a visible scar on the mountainside: 20,000 trees were downed and 47,600 cubic yards of debris ended up in the Lulu Creek and the headwaters of the Colorado River. The Water Supply and Storage Company reached a settlement to pay $9 million in damages to Rocky Mountain National Park. Periodic overflows of the ditch, of which the 2003 flood was but one example, has left debris all over the western side of the valley; the eastern side is not affected.

The Grand River Ditch was listed on the National Register of Historic Places on September 29, 1976. It can be hiked starting from the Bowen/Baker Trailhead in Rocky Mountain National Park.

See also
National Register of Historic Places listings in Grand County, Colorado
 The Colorado-Big Thompson Project, a 1930s tunnel project for diverting Colorado River waters in the same area

References

External links

Historic American Engineering Record (HAER) documentation, filed under Grand Lake, Grand County, CO:

Grand Ditch Breach Restoration Plan, Factsheet 2010

National Register of Historic Places in Rocky Mountain National Park
Infrastructure completed in 1936
Water supply infrastructure on the National Register of Historic Places
Buildings and structures in Grand County, Colorado
Historic American Engineering Record in Colorado
Interbasin transfer